The S4 is an S-Bahn service in the German city of Nuremberg. It is one of the five services of the Nuremberg S-Bahn network. It was opened in 2010 and has 16 stations. Until 9 December 2017 the western terminus was Ansbach. The extension to Dombühl was opened the day after.

Future extensions
In December 2020 the ministers of transportation for Baden Württemberg and Bayern announced their intention to extend the S4 from its current endpoint at Dombühl across the state line to Crailsheim with a proposed entry into service 2024.

Network

References

External links
 

Nuremberg S-Bahn lines
2010 establishments in Germany